Efteling Tycoon is a 2008 video game developed by Dartmoor Softworks and HexArts Entertainment and published by Atari Benelux. In Efteling Tycoon, players can build attractions from the Efteling park in a similar way as in the Rollercoaster Tycoon series.

Development
Efteling Tycoon was planned to be released 12 October 2007, but was delayed until February 2008 to improve the game. Even this deadline was not met and thus the game was released 28 March 2008 and was only released for PC.

References

2008 video games
Amusement park simulation games
Atari games
Windows games
Windows-only games
Video games developed in the Netherlands
Video games set in amusement parks
Efteling